École des Trois-Soleils (Three Suns School) is the only French language school located in Iqaluit, Nunavut and offers classes from Grades K to 12. The school was founded in 2001 and opened in 2002 for classes. After Grade 9, students move on to the high school at Inuksuk High School.

The school is located next to Aqsarniit Ilinniarvik School and Arctic Winter Games Complex.

References

External links
École des Trois-Soleils

Elementary schools in Nunavut
French-language schools in Canada outside Quebec
Education in Iqaluit
Buildings and structures in Iqaluit
Educational institutions established in 2002
2002 establishments in Nunavut